The Mari Depression is a depression in Gornomariysky District, Mari El, Russian Federation.

Geography
The depression is located on the left side of the Volga, from the western borders of the Mari El to the Bolshaya Kokshaga River. The area is now partly flooded by the Cheboksary Reservoir.

Dunes
There are ancient dunes covered with forests located between the rivers.

References
 
 БСЭ: Марийская низменность

Landforms of Mari El
East European Plain
Depressions of Russia
Dunes of Russia